Glinder Au is a river of Schleswig-Holstein and Hamburg, Germany. It flows into the Bille near Billstedt.

See also
List of rivers of Schleswig-Holstein
List of rivers of Hamburg

Rivers of Schleswig-Holstein
Rivers of Hamburg
Rivers of Germany